Heinrich Krug (born 22 September 1911; date of death unknown) was a German water polo player who competed in the 1936 Summer Olympics.

He was part of the German team which won the silver medal. He played one match.

See also
 List of Olympic medalists in water polo (men)

External links
 

1911 births
German male water polo players
Olympic silver medalists for Germany
Olympic water polo players of Germany
Water polo players at the 1936 Summer Olympics
Year of death missing
Olympic medalists in water polo
Medalists at the 1936 Summer Olympics